The 1940 Northern Illinois State Huskies football team represented Northern Illinois State Teachers College—now known as Northern Illinois University—as a member of the Illinois Intercollegiate Athletic Conference (IIAC) during the 1940 college football season. Led by 12th-year head coach Chick Evans, the Huskies compiled an overall record of 6–3 with a mark of 2–2 in conference play, placing fourth in the IIAC. The team played home games at the 5,500-seat Glidden Field, located on the east end of campus, in DeKalb, Illinois.

Schedule

References

Northern Illinois State
Northern Illinois Huskies football seasons
Northern Illinois State Huskies football